Altendorf ( "old village") is a northwestern borough of the city of Essen, Germany. It was incorporated into the city on 1 August 1901. Altendorf consisted of two parts, Oberdorf (upper village) and Unterdorf (lower village). Around 23.000 people live here.

Geography 

Notes

Sources 

Essen